The 2014 Swiss Junior Curling Championships, Switzerland's national Junior curling championships, were held from January 24 to February 2 at the Curlingzentrum Region Basel in Bern, Switzerland.
The winners represented Switzerland at the 2014 World Junior Curling Championships.
8 teams each took part in the men's and women's events.

In the men's final, Yannick Schwaller and his team of Reto Keller, Patrick Witschonke and Michael Probst defeated Team Langenthal-Bern Terratex (Simon Biedermann) 9–6. It's the first title for the team Yannick Schwaller.

In the women's final, Corina Mani and her team of Briar Hürlimann, Rahel Thoma and Tamara Michel defeated Wetzikon-Dübendorf (Elena Stern) 10-9. It's the first title for the team Corina Mani.

Men

Teams

Round-robin standings
Final round-robin standings

 teams to Playoffs

Playoffs

Standings

Women

Teams

Round-robin standings
Final round-robin standings

 teams to Playoffs

Playoffs

Standings

References

External links
Women's final on Youtube

See also
2014 Swiss Men's Curling Championship
2014 Swiss Women's Curling Championship
2014 Swiss Mixed Doubles Curling Championship
2014 Swiss Wheelchair Curling Championship

2014 in curling
Sports competitions in Bern
Curling competitions in Switzerland
Youth sport in Switzerland
National youth sports competitions
Youth curling
2014 in Swiss sport
January 2014 sports events in Europe
February 2014 sports events in Europe